South Sorong Regency is a regency of Southwest Papua province of Indonesia. It has an area of 7,789.92 km2, and had a population of 37,900 at the 2010 Census and 52,469 at the 2020 Census. The administrative centre is the town of Teminabuan.

Geography
South Sorong Regency is located in the western part of Papua Island. Geographically, South Sorong Regency at position 131º 421 0” east longitude - 132º 581 12” east longitude and 0º 55' 12” east longitude - 2º 17' 24” east longitude. South Sorong Regency with an area of 7,789.92 km2:
to the north it is bordered by the Tambrauw Regency; 
in the east it is bordered by Teluk Bintuni Regency and Maybrat Regency; 
to the south it is bordered by Bintuni Bay and the Seram Sea; 
<li>to the west it is bordered by the Seram Sea and Sorong Regency.

Languages
Languages spoken in South Sorong Regency include Inanwatan, Yahadian, Kais, Kokoda, Konda, and Puragi.

Administrative Districts
South Sorong Regency comprises fifteen districts (kecamatan), tabulated below with their areas and their populations at the 2010 Census and the 2020 Census. The table also includes the locations of the district administrative centres, the number of administrative villages (desa and kelurahan) in each district and its post code.

Notes: (a) the area and 2010 population of Kais Darat District are included in the figures for Kais District, from which it was later split. (b)the area and 2010 population of Salkma District are included in the figures for Sawiat District, from which it was later split.

References

External links
Statistics publications from Statistics Indonesia (BPS)

Regencies of Southwest Papua